Marc Oberon is an English magician, based in Nottingham.

He has won the USA People's Trophy, European Close Up Championships, the Macmillan International Award and British Ring of the International Brotherhood of Magicians.

References

External links
 http://www.marcoberon.com/

Living people
English magicians
Year of birth missing (living people)